Michel Tabachnik (born November 10, 1942) is a Swiss conductor and composer with an international career. Promoter of contemporary music, he has premiered a dozen works by Iannis Xenakis, among others.

He is also the author of essays on music and novels.

In 1995, he was implicated in the case of the Order of the Solar Temple, from which he was acquitted by the courts.

Early years
Tabachnik was born in Geneva, where he studied piano, composition and conducting. As a young conductor he was a protégé of Igor Markevitch, Herbert von Karajan and Pierre Boulez, acting as the latter's assistant for four years, mainly with the BBC Symphony Orchestra, London. This led him to become closely involved with conducting and to perform many world premieres, particularly those of Iannis Xenakis.

Career

International
He has held the position of Chief Conductor of the Gulbenkian Foundation Orchestra in Lisbon, the Orchestre Philharmonique de Lorraine, the Ensemble InterContemporain in Paris and the Northern Netherlands Orchestra (Groningen). His roster of orchestras includes the Berlin Philharmonic, Concertgebouw Orchestra, Amsterdam, Tokyo NHK, Orchestre de Paris and festivals such as Lucerne, Salzburg and Aix-en-Provence.

In the operatic field Tabachnik has conducted in the opera houses of Paris, Geneva, Zürich, Copenhagen, Lisbon, Rome and Montreal. He has been a regular guest with the Canadian Opera Company in Toronto, where he led, among other works, Lohengrin, Madama Butterfly, Carmen and The Rake's Progress.

Pedagogue
Tabachnik works with several youth orchestras. He was Artistic Director of l'Orchestre des Jeunes du Québec (1985–1989) and, over a twelve-year period, l'Orchestre des Jeunes de la Méditerranée, which he founded in 1984.

He is also a pedagogue. In addition to leading Master Classes in Amsterdam (NOS), Lisbon (the Gulbenkian Foundation), Paris Conservatoire, Stockholm Conservatory, and others, he has also held the position of Professor of Conducting at both the Faculty of Music, University of Toronto (1984–1991), and the Royal Danish Academy of Music in Copenhagen (1993–2001).

Composer
In addition to his work as a conductor, Tabachnik is also a composer. He has been honored with many commissions including "La Légende de Haïsha" for the anniversary of the Bicentenary of the French Revolution, "Le Cri de Mohim" for the 700th Year of Switzerland, and "Le Pacte des Onze" for I.R.C.A.M. Paris.

Tabachnik records for Erato and Lyrinx, with whom he has been associated since 1991. His discography includes Beethoven, Wagner, Honegger and Iannis Xenakis. His recording of the Schumann Piano Concerto (with Catherine Collard as soloist) was voted Best Performance of the work by the international jury at the Radio Suisse Romande.

In 1995, Tabachnik was named Artist of the Year by the Italian "Centro Internazionale di Arte e Cultura" in Rome.

Order of the Solar Temple
Passionate about philosophy, esotericism and spirituality, Michel Tabachnik met in 1977 Joseph Di Mambro, one of the two future leaders of the Order of the Solar Temple (OTS). In 1981, he became the president of the Golden Way Foundation that Di Mambro had created three years earlier in Geneva. Within the framework of the OTS, Tabachnik wrote the Arkhaios, esoteric texts that circulated within the OTS.

Between 1994 and 2006, following the tragedies that occurred within the OTS, he was prosecuted in France for "participation in an association of criminals" on the only base of these Arkhaios. On June 25, 2001, he was acquitted by the Grenoble criminal court. The public prosecutor's office having appealed, he was acquitted a second time in December 2006. The public prosecutor had considered that Tabachnik was not an important member of the OTS. The Swiss justice system dismissed the cases of the tragedies in Salvan and Cheiry, Switzerland (October 1994).

Later career

Since September 2005, Tabachnik is chief-conductor of the Noord Nederlands Orkest (NNO).

From 2008 until 2015, Tabachnik was the music director and chief-conductor of the Brussels Philharmonic.

Publications
 Il était une fois un enfant, novel, publisher de l'Aire, 1999.
 De la Musique avant toute chose, essay, préface by Régis Debray, Essai, éd. Buchet/Chastel, 2008.
 L’Homme sauvage, novel, publisher Ring, 2013.
 Ma Rhapsodie, essay, publisher Buchet/Chastel, 2016.
 Le Libraire de Saint-Sulpice, novel,  publisher Otago 2017.
 L’Enlèvement au Sinaï, novel, publisher Otago, 2019.
 Demain au Marmara Taskim, novel, publisher L'Harmattan, 2022.
 La Pierre de Siloé, novel, publisher L'Harmattan, 2022.

Compositions musicales 

Supernovae, 1967
Frise, 1968
Fresque, 1969
Invention à 16 voix, 1972
Mondes, 1972
Sillages, 1972
D'autres Sillages, 1972
Movimenti, 1973
Éclipses, 1974
Argile, 1974
Trois Impressions, 1975
Les Perséïdes, 1981
Cosmogonie, 1981
l'Arch, 1982
7 Rituels Atlantes, 1984
Pacte des onze (Évangile selon Thomas), 1985
Élévation, 1990
Prélude à la Légende, 1989
Le Cri de Mohim, 1991
Évocation, 1994
La Légende de Haïsha, 1989
Concerto pour piano et orchestre de chambre, 2003
Nord pour orchestre, 2006
Diptyque-écho, Concerto pour violon et orchestre, 2008
 Genèse, pour violon solo et orchestre, 2010
 Lumières fossiles, pour orchestre, 2011
 Benjamin, dernière nuit, opéra, 2012
 Le livre de Job, 2013
 Benjamin, dernière nuit, drame lyrique en quatorze scènes, 2016
 "Sumer", concerto pour violoncelle et orchestre, 2019
 "Genèse II", concerto pour violon et orchestre, 2021

References

External links
[Music: https://michel-tabachnik-livres.org/]
[Books: https://michel-tabachnik-livres.org/]

1942 births
Living people
Musicians from Geneva
Order of the Solar Temple
Swiss composers
Swiss male composers
Swiss conductors (music)
Male conductors (music)
20th-century Swiss musicians
21st-century Swiss musicians
20th-century conductors (music)
21st-century conductors (music)
20th-century male musicians
21st-century male musicians